Atçalı can refer to:

 Atçalı, Çorum
 Atçalı Kel Mehmet